Sufiyah (also Romanized as Şūfīyah; also known as Al Başūf and Boşūf) is a village in Hoseyni Rural District, in the Central District of Shadegan County, Khuzestan Province, Iran. At the 2006 census, its population was 147, in 23 families.

References 

Populated places in Shadegan County